Statistics of the Scottish Football League in season 1918–19. The competition won by Celtic by one point over nearest rival Rangers.

League table

Results

See also
1918–19 in Scottish football

References

 
1918-19